Ben Binyamin is an Israeli footballer currently playing for Maccabi Sha'arayim in the Liga Alef.

Club career statistics
(correct as of Feb 2013)

Honours
 Liga Leumit
 Runner-up (1): 2008–09

References

1985 births
Living people
Israeli Jews
Israeli footballers
Hapoel Acre F.C. players
Maccabi Shlomi Nahariya F.C. players
Hapoel Afula F.C. players
Hapoel Herzliya F.C. players
Maccabi Netanya F.C. players
Hapoel Ra'anana A.F.C. players
Hapoel Nir Ramat HaSharon F.C. players
Maccabi Sha'arayim F.C. players
Liga Leumit players
Israeli Premier League players
Israeli people of Iranian-Jewish descent
Footballers from Nahariya
Association football midfielders